Worthen is a village in Shropshire, England.

Worthen may also refer to:

Worthen (surname)
Worthen, Arkansas, unincorporated community in Galla Township, Pope County, Arkansas, United States
Worthen's sparrow (Spizella wortheni), species of sparrow

See also
John E. Worthen Arena, basketball arena in Muncie, Indiana, United States